Plomin may refer to:

 Plomin, a town in Croatia
 Plomin Power Station, a power station near Plomin, Croatia
 Plomin tablet, a Croatian Glagolitic inscription at the outer wall of the church of Saint George in Plomin, Croatia
 Robert Plomin, an American psychologist